A causeway is a road or railway elevated by a bank, usually across a broad body of water or wetland.

Causeway may also refer to:

Locations
 Battleship Parkway, commonly referred to "The Causeway", Mobile, Alabama
 Causeway, County Kerry, a village in the Republic of Ireland
 Causeway Bay, a heavily built-up area of Hong Kong
 Causeway Islands, four small islands near the Pacific entrance to the Panama Canal
 Causeway Road, a main road in Hong Kong
 Giant's Causeway, a rock formation in Northern Ireland
 Lake Pontchartrain Causeway, the world's second longest over-water bridge, Louisiana, United States
 Causeway Lane, the home ground of Matlock Town F.C., an English football club
 The Causeway, two bridges that span the Swan River in Perth, Western Australia
 The Causeway, Bermuda 
 Johor–Singapore Causeway, which links Malaysia to Singapore

Other uses 
 Causeway: A Passage from Innocence, a 2006 book by Linden MacIntyre
 Causeway (film), an American drama film
 Causeway Bay station, a station on MTR's Island line on Hong Kong Island
 Causeway Classic, the annual College football game between the University of California, Davis and the California State University, Sacramento
 Causeway Films, Australian film production company, maker of The Babadook 
 Causeway Institute, an educational institution in Northern Ireland
 Causeway Point, one of the largest shopping malls in Singapore